Thumatha lunaris is a moth in the family Erebidae. It was described by Antonio Durante in 2007. It is found in Niger.

References

Moths described in 2007
Nudariina